Mário Nuno dos Santos Ferreira (born 1968) is a Portuguese businessman and entrepreneur in the tourism, hotel, real estate and photography sectors, among others.

On 4 August 2022 at 8:57 (GMT-5), as part of the Blue Origin NS-22 mission, Mário Ferreira lifted off from Corn Ranch, Texas to space on board of New Shepard (NS4). He became the first Portuguese person to travel to space.

References

Portuguese businesspeople
Living people
1968 births
People who have flown in suborbital spaceflight